Miguel de Jesús Ramírez (born 16 March 1994), nicknamed Mon, is a Dominican international footballer who plays for Moca FC as a forward.

External links 
 
 
 

1994 births
Living people
People from San Cristóbal, Dominican Republic
Dominican Republic footballers
Dominican Republic under-20 international footballers
Association football forwards
Association football wingers
Liga Dominicana de Fútbol players
Cibao FC players
Dominican Republic international footballers
Dominican Republic youth international footballers